Vasiliy Dmitriyevich Tikhomirov (1876–1956) was a dancer (from 1895) and a choreographer (from 1913) with the Bolshoi Ballet of Moscow, Russia. His most distinguished production was The Red Poppy (1927), with his wife Yekaterina Geltzer in the main role. After the divorce Yekaterina Geltzer and Vasily Tikhomirov remained onstage partners. 

He and Geltzer were buried in the Novodevichy Cemetery.

See also
List of Russian ballet dancers

1876 births
1956 deaths
Ballets by Vasily Tikhomirov
Soviet male ballet dancers
Male ballet dancers from the Russian Empire
Ballet choreographers
Choreographers from the Russian Empire
Burials at Novodevichy Cemetery
Soviet choreographers